The Spaceships of Ezekiel (1974) is a book by Josef F. Blumrich (March 17, 1913 – February 10, 2002) about a spaceship that was supposedly observed by the prophet Ezekiel, written while the author was chief of NASA's systems layout branch of the program development office at the Marshall Space Flight Center. It was originally published in German by Econ Verlag GmbH under the title Da tat sich der Himmel auf (March 1973).

History 

After ufologists such as Erich von Däniken had pointed to the possibility of interpreting Ezekiel's Merkabah vision as a report of an extraterrestrial spacecraft, Blumrich decided to disprove the hypothesis. However, a thorough examination convinced him that Ezekiel had, in fact, seen a spaceship. He then made detailed drawings of the alien craft. He decided the technology of the builders must have been somewhat higher than mankind's at the present, and added he had seldom felt as delighted, satisfied, and fascinated by being proven wrong.

Content

In The Spaceships of Ezekiel Blumrich asserts that Ezekiel's account in the Bible was not a description of a meeting with God in a prophetic vision, but one of several encounters with ancient astronauts in a shuttlecraft from another planet.

Blumrich analyzes six different translations of the Bible in conjunction with his experience in engineering and presents one possible version of
Ezekiel's visions of how God—described as riding in an elaborate vehicle capable to see, attended by angels—supposedly showed him the future and gave him various messages to deliver. In the appendices to the book he presents technical specifications of the hypothesized spacecraft.

Blumrich also published an article on his belief, "The spaceships of the prophet Ezekiel", in the UNESCO journal Impact of Science on Society.

Omni wheel

Blumrich proposed a wheel that is capable of rotating not only in the forward-backward direction, but also sideways, based on his interpretation of the description in Ezekiel, and patented it. The wheel is now known as Omni wheel, and it is used in special applications.

Criticism
Ronald Story in his book Guardians of the Universe? (1980) stated "Blumrich doctors up his Biblical quotes just a smidgen to make them conform a little better to his spaceship interpretation", and "The Spaceships of Ezekiel, in all honesty, can only be described as an extreme form of rationalisation, with a good supply of technical jargon, charts, and diagrams, carefully designed to impress the general reader. The book does contain a good collection of impressive drawings which prove nothing more than that whoever prepared them is a good draughtsman."  Jerome Clark wrote that Blumrich "offered a creative but misplaced effort to translate the metaphorical biblical account into a properly engineered spacecraft."

See also
 Ancient astronaut theories
 Ezekiel 1
 Ezekiel Airship

Notes

External links 

 About Josef F. Blumrich, NASA Engineer and Author 
 

 

 
 Original of "Figure 3. An example of the traditional version" (Spaceships p. 16) with original's German poem and English translation

1974 non-fiction books
Books about extraterrestrial life
Ancient astronaut speculation
Book of Ezekiel